The 1950 Coppa Acerbo (also known as the 1950 Pescara Grand Prix) was a non-championship Formula One motor race held on 15 August 1950 at the Pescara Circuit, in Italy.

Classification

Qualifying

Race

References

External links 
 Results at Motor Sport magazine database

Coppa Acerbo
Coppa Acerbo